Piantedo (Pianté in lombard) is a comune (municipality) in the Province of Sondrio in the Italian region Lombardy, located about 80 km north of Milan and about 35 km west of Sondrio. As of 31 December 2004, it had a population of 1,258 and an area of 6.7 km².

Piantedo borders the following municipalities: Colico, Delebio, Dubino, Gera Lario, Pagnona.

References

Cities and towns in Lombardy